Kryvonis or Kryvonos is a Ukrainian surname. Notable people with the surname include:

 Maksym Kryvonis (d. 1648), Ukrainian Cossack leader
 Nikita Kryvonos (born 1986), American tennis player

Ukrainian-language surnames